Remember Me is a 1998 song by Journey. The song was originally written and performed as part of the soundtrack for Armageddon. It was the first song that Steve Augeri performed as the new lead singer for the band in 1998.

Notes

References 

1998 songs
Journey (band) songs
Songs written by Jonathan Cain
Songs written by Neal Schon
Songs written by Jack Blades